Glaze Township is an inactive township in Miller County, in the U.S. state of Missouri.

Glaze Township was established in 1838, taking its name from the Grandglaize Creek.

References

Townships in Missouri
Townships in Miller County, Missouri